Candix Records was an independent American record label known primarily for releasing the Beach Boys' first single, "Surfin'. Prior to releasing their first single on Candix, the Beach Boys were briefly known as the Surfers, the name included on the original acetate that found its way to Candix. Candix A&R man Joe Saraceno and Buckeye Distributors' Russ Regan are attributed with re-naming the Surfers as the Beach Boys because of the existence of a group already called the Surfers, recording for Richard Vaughn's Hollywood based label Hi-Fi Records.

Incorporated on 26 August 1960, with an office at 6425 Hollywood Boulevard in Los Angeles, the label was headed by the Dix brothers and William Silva.

The record label closed its doors around August–September 1962, just a few months after The Beach Boys signed with Capitol Records. The Candix record label was always plagued with 'cash flow' problems and this was one source of bitterness in the Beach Boys' camp, the group having only received a total of $990 in royalties from a record that had made the top 5 in Los Angeles and San Bernardino County, become a top hitpick in San Francisco, and made the national charts for some weeks.

Discography

References

American record labels
Companies based in Los Angeles
Record labels established in 1960
Record labels disestablished in 1962